Williston Northampton School (simply referred to as Williston) is a private, co-educational, day and boarding college-preparatory school in Easthampton, Massachusetts, United States. It was established in 1841.

History 

Williston Seminary was founded by Samuel Williston (1795–1874), a wealthy button manufacturer, in February 1841; the school opened that December, with a dedication address by Mark Hopkins, president of nearby Williams College. The idea of opening a new academy in the neighborhood had been in the air ever since the closing in 1834 of the Round Hill School in nearby Northampton. In its early days, there was no arrangement of studies by terms and the students were not classified. Luther Wright, its principal from 1841 to 1849, believed it was desirable to have his pupils study together in a single room under his direction. However, the school's student population grew rapidly and the one-room schoolhouse scheme was soon no longer practicable, as more instructors and new buildings were added. By the 1850s the schools campus was dominated by three large buildings: North Hall, Middle Hall and South Hall. For many years the school was co-educational, with the students divided and taught separately in male and female departments, but in 1864 the female division was discontinued.

The seminary comprised two faculties: classical and scientific. With the departure in 1863 of the school's second president, Josiah Clark, a classicist Greek and Latin scholar who had vigorously fought against the expansion of the English department, the school's curriculum began to be modernized. Samuel Williston remained the dominant influence in the school's growth until his death in 1874. In the late 19th century the dual curricula had evolved into a more modern comprehensive course (e.g. with "scientific and preparatory departments", and in 1924 the school was renamed Williston Academy. During the 1960s Williston began to examine possibilities for coeducation, and in 1971, merged with its longtime sister school, the Northampton School for Girls, to become the Williston Northampton School.  Starting as a preparatory academy for those seeking the clergy, the school now integrates a core college preparatory curriculum with electives and special opportunities, while emphasizing mastery of language, clarity of thought and academic integrity.

Students and faculty 

Williston Northampton encompasses the middle school (7th and 8th grade) and the upper school (9th-12th and postgraduate).

The school had 486 students in the 2017-2018 academic year with 58.6 teachers on a full-time equivalent basis, and a student–teacher ratio of 8.3. Its boarding students come from 25 states and 30 countries around the world. International students come from eastern Asia, the Middle East and Europe.

Most teachers also take on the roles of dorm parents, advisors, and athletics coaches, fostering deep relationships with students. Arts programs at Williston include photography, filmmaking, drawing, painting, theatre, and dance.

According to the school, 62% of students taking the 2009 AP exams scored 4 or 5, and 51 members of the class of 2009 gained admission at Barron's 75 most competitive colleges. Over a ten-year period, six students were published in The Concord Review.

The campus 

The  campus is located in Easthampton, Massachusetts, within view of Mount Tom.

Many of the school's buildings and dorms are situated around the main quad. In 2017, construction began on a new dorm across from the main part of campus. The Schoolhouse, a former factory building remodeled in the 1950s to resemble the old schoolhouse building on the original Main Street campus, holds English and math classes and also contains administrative offices. In 1996, the former gymnasium, originally built in 1924, was transformed into the Reed Campus Center. In 2019, the athletic center was named the Sabina Cain Family Athletic Center. The Dodge Room is the setting for many guest speakers, including the school's Writers' Workshop series.

After a fire destroyed the school's theater building in 1994, it was rebuilt adjacent to the science laboratories, Scott Hall. The Williston Theatre is a 250-seat performance space.

The Robert Clapp Memorial Library is located near the center of the campus. The library has a 40,000+ collection.

The Middle School is housed in the Whitaker-Bement Center. It was created in 1972 in honor of the Northampton School for Girls founders Sarah B. Whitaker and Dorothy M. Bement. The Phillips Stevens Chapel (1964) hosts both the weekly assembly in its traditional chapel and language classes in its basement.

Life at Williston 
The school year begins in September and usually ends in the first week of June. Each student typically takes five classes at a time. 27 courses may be taken at Advanced Placement (AP) level. Classes begin at 8:30 a.m. and end in the early afternoon, when many students head off to their athletic practices. Upper school students attend Saturday classes every other week.

Athletics 

Students are required to participate in after-school sports, although they may choose an alternative elective course. The facilities support the program's 63 teams played in 30 sports.

Williston traditions 

A tradition at the Williston Northampton School is the painting of the school lion. At least several times a year, students spray paint the statue of a lion on the center of campus.

The student newspaper, The Willistonian, is the longest continuously published high school newspaper in the country.

School song 

The school's alma mater, O Williston, made its debut on September 14, 2007, and is performed at formal occasions such as Convocation and Baccalaureate. New lyrics were set to an 1867 hymn by Henry Smart.

Other school songs include "Sammy", which refers to founding headmaster Samuel Williston.

The "Williston Hymn" was a standby at the beginning and end of year assemblies, as well as at the Cum Laude assembly, for many decades, but was discontinued sometime in the 2000s. The tune of the hymn was that of the German national anthem, "Deutschlandlied". Long before Germany adopted it, the melody was composed by Joseph Haydn as "Gott erhalte Franz den Kaiser", an anthem to Francis II of Austria. In 1797, Haydn incorporated it into the second movement of his Emperor Quartet, op. 76, no. 3.

Notable alumni

Notable faculty 
 Amos Alonzo Stagg, former football coach
 Barry Moser, former faculty

Gallery

References

External links 

 
 Williston Seminary Alumni Records 1842-1874

Schools in Hampshire County, Massachusetts
Boarding schools in Massachusetts
Private middle schools in Massachusetts
Private high schools in Massachusetts
Private preparatory schools in Massachusetts
Educational institutions established in 1841
1841 establishments in Massachusetts